Hamm is a municipality in the district of Bitburg-Prüm, in Rhineland-Palatinate, western Germany.

Hamm consists of only a few houses along the Hauptstrasse (main street). It is overlooked by Hamm Castle which dates back to the 11th century and is one of the largest medieval castles in the Eifel region.

References

Bitburg-Prüm